Protein FAM20B is a protein that in humans is encoded by the FAM20B gene.

References

Further reading